The Carlsbad 1911 chess tournament was one of four well-known international chess tournaments held in the spa city of Carlsbad (Bohemia, then Austria-Hungary Empire). The other tournament years were 1907, 1923 and 1929.

The opening ceremony was held at the imperial bath hotel Kurhaus (Kaiserbad) on 20 August 1911. Twenty-six chess masters were invited to participate in the enormous round-robin tournament (325 games). Of the top players in the world then only two were missing from the tournament: Emanuel Lasker and José Raúl Capablanca. The participants played from 20 August to 24 September 1911. At the end Richard Teichmann was the winner.

The final standings and crosstable:

{|class="wikitable" 
|  style="background:#f0f0f0;"|#
|  style="background:#f0f0f0;"|Player
|  style="background:#f0f0f0;"|1
|  style="background:#f0f0f0;"|2
|  style="background:#f0f0f0;"|3
|  style="background:#f0f0f0;"|4
|  style="background:#f0f0f0;"|5
|  style="background:#f0f0f0;"|6
|  style="background:#f0f0f0;"|7
|  style="background:#f0f0f0;"|8
|  style="background:#f0f0f0;"|9
|  style="background:#f0f0f0;"|10
|  style="background:#f0f0f0;"|11
|  style="background:#f0f0f0;"|12
|  style="background:#f0f0f0;"|13
|  style="background:#f0f0f0;"|14
|  style="background:#f0f0f0;"|15
|  style="background:#f0f0f0;"|16
|  style="background:#f0f0f0;"|17
|  style="background:#f0f0f0;"|18
|  style="background:#f0f0f0;"|19
|  style="background:#f0f0f0;"|20
|  style="background:#f0f0f0;"|21
|  style="background:#f0f0f0;"|22
|  style="background:#f0f0f0;"|23
|  style="background:#f0f0f0;"|24
|  style="background:#f0f0f0;"|25
|  style="background:#f0f0f0;"|26
|  style="background:#f0f0f0;"|Total
|-
|1|| ||  * ||1 ||1 ||1 ||½ ||1 ||½ ||½ ||1 ||0 ||1 ||1 ||½ ||½ ||½ ||1 ||0 ||½ ||½ ||½ ||1 ||1 ||½ ||1 ||1 ||1 || 18
|- 
|2||   || 0 ||* ||½ ||½ ||0 ||½ ||½ ||1 ||½ ||1 ||1 ||0 ||½ ||1 ||1 ||½ ||1 ||1 ||1 ||½ ||½ ||½ ||1 ||1 ||1 ||1 || 17
|-
|3||   || 0 ||½ ||* ||0 ||½ ||½ ||½ ||1 ||½ ||0 ||1 ||½ ||1 ||1 ||1 ||1 ||1 ||0 ||½ ||1 ||1 ||1 ||½ ||1 ||1 ||1 || 17
|-
|4||  || 0 ||½ ||1 ||* ||1 ||1 ||0 ||0 ||1 ||½ ||0 ||1 ||1 ||0 ||1 ||1 ||0 ||1 ||1 ||1 ||1 ||0 ||0 ||1 ||1 ||1 || 16
|-
|5||   || ½ ||1 ||½ ||0 ||* ||½ ||0 ||½ ||½ ||1 ||½ ||½ ||½ ||½ ||1 ||1 ||½ ||1 ||0 ||1 ||½ ||1 ||0 ||1 ||1 ||1 || 15½
|-
|6||   || 0 ||½ ||½ ||0 ||½ ||* ||½ ||0 ||0 ||0 ||½ ||½ ||1 ||1 ||1 ||½ ||½ ||1 ||1 ||1 ||½ ||1 ||1 ||1 ||1 ||1 || 15½
|-
|7||   ||  ½ ||½ ||½ ||1 ||1 ||½ ||* ||0 ||½ ||1 ||0 ||1 ||½ ||0 ||1 ||½ ||1 ||0 ||0 ||½ ||½ ||1 ||1 ||½ ||1 ||1 || 15½
|-
|8||   ||½ ||0 ||0 ||1 ||½ ||1 ||1 ||* ||½ ||0 ||1 ||½ ||½ ||0 ||0 ||½ ||1 ||½ ||1 ||0 ||1 ||0 ||1 ||1 ||1 ||0 || 13½
|-
|9||   || 0 ||½ ||½ ||0 ||½ ||1 ||½ ||½ ||* ||1 ||0 ||½ ||½ ||½ ||½ ||1 ||0 ||1 ||1 ||1 ||1 ||0 ||1 ||0 ||0 ||1 || 13½
|-
|10||   || 1 ||0 ||1 ||½ ||0 ||1 ||0 ||1 ||0 ||* ||0 ||0 ||½ ||1 ||0 ||0 ||½ ||1 ||1 ||½ ||½ ||1 ||½ ||1 ||½ ||1 || 13½
|-
|11||    || 0 ||0 ||0 ||1 ||½ ||½ ||1 ||0 ||1 ||1 ||* ||0 ||0 ||1 ||½ ||1 ||0 ||½ ||0 ||0 ||1 ||1 ||1 ||1 ||½ ||1 || 13½
|-
|12||   || 0 ||1 ||½ ||0 ||½ ||½ ||0 ||½ ||½ ||1 ||1 ||* ||0 ||1 ||1 ||½ ||½ ||½ ||1 ||½ ||½ ||1 ||0 ||0 ||1 ||0 || 13
|-
|13||   ||½ ||½ ||0 ||0 ||½ ||0 ||½ ||½ ||½ ||½ ||1 ||1 ||* ||½ ||1 ||½ ||1 ||1 ||0 ||1 ||½ ||0 ||0 ||0 ||0 ||1 || 12
|-
|14||  || ½ ||0 ||0 ||1 ||½ ||0 ||1 ||1 ||½ ||0 ||0 ||0 ||½ ||* ||½ ||½ ||1 ||0 ||1 ||1 ||0 ||0 ||½ ||1 ||1 ||0 || 11½
|-
|15||   || ½ ||0 ||0 ||0 ||0 ||0 ||0 ||1 ||½ ||1 ||½ ||0 ||0 ||½ ||* ||1 ||1 ||½ ||½ ||½ ||1 ||1 ||1 ||0 ||1 ||0 || 11½
|-
|16||   ||0 ||½ ||0 ||0 ||0 ||½ ||½ ||½ ||0 ||1 ||0 ||½ ||½ ||½ ||0 ||* ||1 ||1 ||0 ||½ ||0 ||1 ||½ ||1 ||1 ||1 || 11½
|-
|17||  || 1 ||0 ||0 ||1 ||½ ||½ ||0 ||0 ||1 ||½ ||1 ||½ ||0 ||0 ||0 ||0 ||* ||0 ||½ ||1 ||½ ||1 ||1 ||1 ||0 ||0 || 11
|-
|18||  || ½ ||0 ||1 ||0 ||0 ||0 ||1 ||½ ||0 ||0 ||½ ||½ ||0 ||1 ||½ ||0 ||1 ||* ||1 ||½ ||½ ||0 ||½ ||½ ||1 ||½ || 11
|-
|19||    ||½ ||0 ||½ ||0 ||1 ||0 ||1 ||0 ||0 ||0 ||1 ||0 ||1 ||0 ||½ ||1 ||½ ||0 ||* ||½ ||1 ||0 ||1 ||1 ||0 ||0 || 10½
|-
|20||   || ½ ||½ ||0 ||0 ||0 ||0 ||½ ||1 ||0 ||½ ||1 ||½ ||0 ||0 ||½ ||½ ||0 ||½ ||½ ||* ||½ ||1 ||½ ||0 ||1 ||1 || 10½
|-
|21||  || 0 ||½ ||0 ||0 ||½ ||½ ||½ ||0 ||0 ||½ ||0 ||½ ||½ ||1 ||0 ||1 ||½ ||½ ||0 ||½ ||* ||½ ||1 ||1 ||0 ||1 || 10½
|-
|22||   ||0 ||½ ||0 ||1 ||0 ||0 ||0 ||1 ||1 ||0 ||0 ||0 ||1 ||1 ||0 ||0 ||0 ||1 ||1 ||0 ||½ ||* ||1 ||0 ||0 ||1 || 10
|-
|23||   || ½ ||0 ||½ ||1 ||1 ||0 ||0 ||0 ||0 ||½ ||0 ||1 ||1 ||½ ||0 ||½ ||0 ||½ ||0 ||½ ||0 ||0 ||* ||½ ||½ ||0 ||  8½
|-
|24||   ||0 ||0 ||0 ||0 ||0 ||0 ||½ ||0 ||1 ||0 ||0 ||1 ||1 ||0 ||1 ||0 ||0 ||½ ||0 ||1 ||0 ||1 ||½ ||* ||0 ||1  || 8½
|-
|25||   ||0 ||0 ||0 ||0 ||0 ||0 ||0 ||0 ||1 ||½ ||½ ||0 ||1 ||0 ||0 ||0 ||1 ||0 ||1 ||0 ||1 ||1 ||½ ||1 ||* ||0  || 8½
|-
|26||   || 0 ||0 ||0 ||0 ||0 ||0 ||0 ||1 ||0 ||0 ||0 ||1 ||0 ||1 ||1 ||0 ||1 ||½ ||1 ||0 ||0 ||0 ||1 ||0 ||1 ||*  || 8½
|}

References

See also
Karlsbad 1911 chess games

Chess competitions
Sport in the Kingdom of Bohemia
Sport in Karlovy Vary
Chess in Czechoslovakia
1911 in chess
1911 in Austria-Hungary
20th century in Bohemia
August 1911 sports events